Patrick Pat Heim (born May 25, 1984 in Wayne, Pennsylvania) is a professional lacrosse player who plays for the Boston Cannons in Major League Lacrosse and the Philadelphia Wings in the National Lacrosse League.

High school career
Heim attended Conestoga High School in Berwyn, PA where he played football, wrestling, and lacrosse.  In his senior year at Conestoga, Heim was ranked the #1 wrestler at 189 lbs in Southeastern Pennsylvania.

College career
Heim attended Penn State University where he was named to the All-ECAC First Team three times during his Nittany Lion career.

Professional career
Heim was the 2007 Major League Lacrosse first overall collegiate draft choice by the Chicago Machine.  Heim made an immediate impact and won MLL Rookie of the Week honors for his performance in his first professional game.

Heim went undrafted in the National Lacrosse League entry draft, and was signed as a free agent by Philadelphia Wings.  A Philadelphia area native, he made Wings team and scored in his first game of the 2008 NLL season.

Statistics

MLL

NLL

Penn State University

See also
 Lacrosse in Pennsylvania

References

American lacrosse players
1984 births
Living people
Penn State Nittany Lions men's lacrosse players
Major League Lacrosse players
Philadelphia Wings players
Sportspeople from Pennsylvania